Scam is the fifth studio album by the Australian band The Screaming Jets. It was their first record to be released under Grudge Records, after leaving rooArt. The album debuted and peaked at number 36.

Track listing

Weekly charts

Band members
Dave Gleeson – vocals 
Paul Woseen – bass guitar, backing vocals 
Grant Walmsley – guitar, backing vocals
Ismet Osmanovic – guitar 
Craig Rosevear – drums (tracks 1–5, 8 and 13)
Col Hatchman – drums

References

The Screaming Jets albums
2000 albums